Louis Scheimer (October 19, 1928 – October 17, 2013) was an American producer and voice actor who was one of the original founders of Filmation. He was also credited as an executive producer of many of its cartoons.

Early life and education 
Scheimer was the son of a German Jew who, according to family legend, had to leave Germany in the early 1920s after punching a young Adolf Hitler in 1921 or 1922, "well before" the Beer Hall Putsch.

Scheimer graduated from Carnegie Tech University (now Carnegie Mellon University) in Pittsburgh, Pennsylvania, with a bachelor's degree in fine arts in 1952.

Career 
Early in Filmation's history, Scheimer also contributed a number of guest or secondary voices for the various productions. Among these was the voice of N'kima, Tarzan's monkey companion in Tarzan, Lord of the Jungle (1976–81).

He co-produced Star Trek: The Animated Series, for which he won the Daytime Emmy Award for Outstanding Entertainment - Children's Series.

Scheimer played a significant role in the creation of the cartoons He-Man and the Masters of the Universe and BraveStarr. As well as the executive producer, he was also co-credited for the series' musical score under the pseudonym "Erika Lane" (which combined the names of his daughter Erika and son Lane). It had also been used as a character name on the 1967 Filmation series Fantastic Voyage. He became a voice actor for the show (as he had done for many of his company's previous productions), going under the pseudonym "Erik Gunden". The last name was taken from his father's original surname: "Gundenscheimer" (which was later shortened to Scheimer). The first name was Lou's middle name, which he was not given by his parents, but instead by his wife Jay, who felt that he should have one. Scheimer's contribution to the cast was, in fact, most notable as he voiced several supporting characters, including Orko (and other characters with a similar Smurfs-voice), Stratos, King Randor and others.

The reason that Scheimer performed the voices for so many supporting characters was that the "official" voice actors were contracted to perform no more than three different voices per episode. Since there were usually only three regular cast members working on each show, Scheimer would fill in the rest of the male cast. This is also why his wife and daughter did various small parts in the first season of He-Man. During the second season of He-Man, and all of She-Ra, Erika Scheimer received an onscreen credit as an actor and also directed the voice actors, and she and her father recorded the remaining voices on their own later, because he did not see himself as a "proper" actor and was ashamed of recording with the other voice actors due to severe budget restrictions. The pitch of his voice was often changed by using a "harmonizer", which could control the pitch without altering the speed of the sound.

The animated series also pioneered a type of programming known as first-run syndication. Another first was the storyline being based on an action figure toy; before this time, FCC regulations had prohibited any type of children's programming being based on a toy. Scheimer transformed He-Man from a graphically violent version of Conan the Barbarian into a pro-social character, who imparted a life lesson to impressionable viewers in each episode.

Scheimer's daughter also performed supporting female voices and occasional voice-acting for young boy characters. She later starred in the follow-up series, She-Ra, which Scheimer also produced. He was credited for helping to compose the theme music for both the He-Man and She-Ra series, under his pseudonym "Erika Lane".

In the late 1990s, Scheimer returned to the field of animation. A Dutch investment company, Dreamweavers, NV., approached him with a concept based on an off-kilter Dutchman's renderings of characters aimed at young adults. Scheimer went into production on Robin and the Dreamweavers, an adult animated feature film. Robin, the first human to be born in cyberspace, battles Triple XXX: an evil siren who desires an earthly body, and who gains power through mankind's baser carnal desires. The movie, which has been compared to the majority of Ralph Bakshi's work, was never distributed.

Scheimer also provided consultation work for Gang of Seven (G7) Animation.

The Lou Scheimer Gallery at the ToonSeum, a museum of comic and cartoon art in Pittsburgh, Pennsylvania, is named in his honor.

Voice roles 
Scheimer voiced characters for other Filmation cartoons besides He-Man. Most notably, he provided the voice to "Dumb Donald" on the long-running Fat Albert and the Cosby Kids. He was also the voice of Legal Eagle and the Brown Hornet's sidekick Stinger and the voice-over narrator during the opening credits of the majority of Filmation shows and cartoons. In Jason of Star Command and Space Academy, he was consistently heard as generic voices over intercoms. In the live-action series The Ghost Busters, which starred Forrest Tucker and Larry Storch with Bob Burns, his was the voice of "Zero", the unseen boss of the main characters. Scheimer also provided the voices of Stubby on The New Adventures of Gilligan (1974), Bat-Mite, Jasper Catdaver on Fraidy Cat (1975), the Bat-Computer and Clayface (first two appearances) on The New Adventures of Batman (1977), Mo on Space Sentinels (1977), Spinner and Scarab on Tarzan and the Super 7s Web Woman (1978), Mighty Mouse on The New Adventures of Mighty Mouse and Heckle & Jeckle (1979), Tom Cat, Jerry Mouse, Spike, Tuffy, Slick Wolf and Barney Bear on The Tom and Jerry Comedy Show (1980), the Master Sports Computer and Queen Vanda's computer on Sport Billy (1980), Gremlin on The New Adventures of Flash Gordon (1979), Bumper on Gilligan's Planet (1982) and Tracy the Gorilla on Ghostbusters (1986).

Personal life 
He was married to Joanne "Jay" Wucher (1931–2009) until her death. They had one son, Lane (born 1956) and one daughter, Erika (born 1960).

Scheimer was awarded the Inkpot Award in 2013.

Scheimer underwent quadruple bypass surgery in the late 1990s and was subsequently diagnosed with Parkinson's disease. He died from the disease at his home in Tarzana, California, on October 17, 2013, two days before his 85th birthday.

References

External links

History 
 Guide To Animated Star Trek - Filmation Associates
 Animated Views - A Fond Look Back At Filmation (Part 1) (October 31, 2004)
 Animated Views - A Fond Look Back At Filmation (Part 2) (December 10, 2006)

Interviews 
 The Unofficial Isis Appreciation Page - Interview (July 2002)
 Masters Cast - Comic-Con Interview (QuickTime) (July 30, 2006)
 Retro Crush - David Teague Interview
 The-Trades Interview - R.J. Carter (June 11, 2007)

1928 births
2013 deaths
20th-century American male actors
Businesspeople from Pittsburgh
Animators from Pennsylvania
American animated film producers
American people of German-Jewish descent
Television producers from Pennsylvania
American male voice actors
Carnegie Mellon University College of Fine Arts alumni
Filmation people
Inkpot Award winners
Deaths from Parkinson's disease
Male actors from Pittsburgh